The 2004–05 Grand Prix of Figure Skating Final was an elite figure skating competition held at the Capital Gymnasium in Beijing, China from December 16 to 19, 2004. Medals were awarded in men's singles, ladies' singles, pair skating, and ice dancing.

The Grand Prix Final was the culminating event of the ISU Grand Prix of Figure Skating series, which consisted of Skate America, Skate Canada International, Cup of China, Trophée Éric Bompard, Cup of Russia, and NHK Trophy competitions. The top six skaters from each discipline competed in the final.

Results

Men

Ladies

Pairs
Shen Xue / Zhao Hongbo from China set a new world record under the ISU Judging System for the short program (70.52), for the free skating (136.02), and for the combined total (206.54).

Ice dancing

External links
 

2004 in figure skating
Grand Prix of Figure Skating Final
International figure skating competitions hosted by China